The Blackedge conger (Bathycongrus retrotinctus, also known as the Randall's conger) is an eel in the family Congridae (conger/garden eels). It was described by David Starr Jordan and John Otterbein Snyder in 1901, originally under the genus Leptocephalus. It is a marine, deep water-dwelling eel which is known from Japan to the Philippines, in the western Pacific Ocean. It dwells at a depth range of 150–450 metres. Males can reach a maximum total length of 54 centimetres.

References

Bathycongrus
Fish described in 1901
Taxa named by David Starr Jordan